China Development Bank International Investment Limited is a Cayman Islands-incorporated investment company headquartered in Hong Kong. It was listed company on the Hong Kong stock exchange since 1994 (as ING Beijing Investment, formerly "Honlinda Limited"), and is a red chip company.

History
The bank was listed as a red chip company on 10 My 1994. The listed company was known as "New Capital International Investment" from 2003 to 2012. New Capital International Investment took-over ING Beijing Investment, by-then a listed company that incorporated in Hong Kong in 2005. ING Beijing was dissolved in 2007. New Capital International Investment replaced the Hong Kong incorporated company as the new holding company of the group as well as the listing status. It was renamed to the current name after a takeover by the state-owned China Development Bank.

China Development Bank International Investment was planned to form a joint venture with EIG Global Energy Partners in 2015.

Shareholders
In 2002, the largest shareholder of ING Beijing Investment was ING Group for 15.78% shares (85,140,000 number of shares). After the takeover by New Capital International Investment, ING Group still owned the same number of shares, but decreased to 13.16% of total share capital; the largest shareholder was Sense Control International Limited for 16.63%, a company owned by Lin Si Yu.

, China Development Bank International Investment was majority owned by Chinese stated-owned China Development Bank.

See also 
 Cayman Islands company law
 Belt and Road Initiative

References

External links
 

China Development Bank
Investment banks in Hong Kong
Offshore companies of the Cayman Islands
Companies listed on the Hong Kong Stock Exchange
Government-owned companies of China
ING Group